Marcel Gaudart or Marc Gaudart (10 June 1913–2 July 1959) was a film director, producer, former Jesuit priest (Licence Théologie) and member of the French Resistance. He was sometimes known as Marcel Goddart.

Life and work
He was born Marie-François-Antoine-Marcel Gaudart on 10 June 1913, at Pondichéry (in French India). Member of the family Gaudart of India, son of Joseph-James Gaudart and Eugénie Le Gay. He became a Jesuit priest, but he was released from his vows by Pope Pius XII. On 14 April 1951, he was married, at Innsbruck (Austrian Tyrol), to Dorothea Johanna Hübel. They were divorced in Austria on 15 October 1957. 

After leaving the religious world, Gaudart became a film producer/director and made several films. He had started his film and sound career after the Second World War, when he was recording interviews and plays for some European radio broadcasters. He moved on to film very quickly and became a TV producer in the 1950s. Although already being successful in Canada, he moved on to Mexico.

For one film, he was in Mexico, where he died (officially on 4 July 1959, his burial date) in rather odd circumstances. Some members of his family think him to be still alive.

The Fables of La Fontaine

Marc Gaudart produced the Canadian television series Fables of La Fontaine (or Tales of La Fontaine).
As a French producer in Canada, Marc Gaudart was responsible for this series of fifteen-minute fables with animal characters, based on stories by the 17th century poet La Fontaine. The films employed the talents of animals from the farm of Lorna Jackson in Mount Albert, Ontario. Gaudart set the animals (mostly small, relatively tame kind, such as parrots, frogs, cats, and pigeons) in miniature sets to "act out" the stories. Cinematographer Fritz Spiess had to spend "hours studying each of the animals used in the series to get to know the different problems posed by each--such as a mouse who refused to ride in canoes, a bored monkey who was fascinated by studio wires and rafters, and a rabbit who became so fond of sitting in a jeep that he refused to get out and race with a turtle".

Film about Gaudart
Marcel Gaudart died over 50 years ago. The adage, "Time goes by but memory remains" is the reason why his granddaughter Nadine Taschler has worked on a 16mm documentary film called "Les Fables de Monsieur Gaudart" which was planned for release in 2012.

Work partners

Some co-workers include (note that the type of co-work is not always described):

 Lorna Jackson, animal trainer for the Fables
 Monica Clare
 Fritz Spiess, cinematographer
 József K. Szekeres (Josef Seckeresh; Joe Seckerish)
 Amelia Hall, story teller for the Fables
 Sydney Banks
 Valerie Varda
 Spencer Wood Caldwell
 Frank Radford "Budge" Crawley
 Yousuf Karsh

See also
 Fables of La Fontaine
 Canadian Association of Broadcasters
 History of the Gaudart Family (in French)

References

External links
Valerie Varda, Glamour girls of the Silver Screen
The Fritz Spiess Archive
film "Les Fables de Monsieur Gaudart"
Austrian Films
Nadine Taschler
 

1913 births
1959 deaths
Canadian film producers
Canadian television producers